, a Latin phrase, means "The world wants to be deceived, so let it be deceived."

Attributions 

Various claims have been made as to the phrase's origin:

 "." Sebastian Franck, Paradoxa Ducenta Octoginta, CCXXXVIII (1542) "The world loves to be deceived."
 "Au[gu]stin[e], lib. 4. de civitat. Dei, cap. 27. censures ' Scævola saying and acknowledging , that it was a fit thing cities should be deceived by religion, according to the diverb, if the world will be gulled, let it be gulled, 'tis good howsoever to keep it in subjection." (Robert Burton, The Anatomy of Melancholy, first published 1621) 
 "The pontifex maximus Scævola thought it expedient that the people should be deceived in religion; and the learned Varro said plainly, that there are many truths, which it is useless for the vulgar to know; and many falsities which it is fit the people should not suppose are falsities. (Note: Vid Augustin. de civ. Dei, B. 4 [...].) Hence comes the adage "."

Misattribution 

Some claim that the 1st century satirist Petronius originated this expression, but it appears nowhere in the surviving copies of his work.

References

Latin words and phrases